The 2016–17 Liberty Flames men's basketball team represented Liberty University in the 2016–17 NCAA Division I men's basketball season. The team played its home games in Lynchburg, Virginia for the 27th consecutive season at Vines Center, with a capacity of 8,085. The team was led by Ritchie McKay, who was in his fourth season, but second season since his return to the program. They were members of the Big South Conference. They finished the season 21–14, 14–4 in Big South play to finish in a third place. They were upset in Quarterfinals of the Big South tournament by Radford. They were invited to the CollegeInsider.com Tournament where they defeated Norfolk State in the first round to be champions of the Coach John McLendon Classic. In the Second Round they defeated Samford before losing in the quarterfinals to UMBC.

Previous season
The Flames finished the 2015–16 season 13–19, 10–8 in Big South play to finish in a tie for fifth place. They lost in the quarterfinals of the Big South tournament to UNC Asheville.

Departures

2016–17 Newcomers

Roster

Roster is subject to change as/if players transfer or leave the program for other reasons.

Schedule and results

|-
!colspan=12 style=| Non-conference regular season

|-
!colspan=12 style=| Big South regular season

|-
!colspan=12 style=|Big South tournament

|-
!colspan=12 style=|CIT

References

Liberty Flames basketball seasons
Liberty
Liberty
Liberty Fl
Liberty Fl